"Hey Love (Can I Have a Word)" is a song by American R&B singer R. Kelly and Public Announcement featuring Mr. Lee, on their debut album Born into the 90's. The song incorporates the melody and lyrics of Stevie Wonder's "Hey Love" from his 1966 album Down to Earth. It reached number one on the Bubbling Under Hot 100 chart in Billboard and number 15 on the R&B chart.

Charts

Weekly charts

Year-end charts

References

1992 songs
1993 singles
R. Kelly songs
Songs written by Clarence Paul
Songs written by Stevie Wonder
Songs written by R. Kelly
New jack swing songs
Songs written by Morris Broadnax